Aspern is a lake in the municipality of Aremark in Viken county, Norway.

See also
List of lakes in Norway

Aremark
Lakes of Viken (county)